Carlos Mendieta y Montefur (4 November 1873 – 27 September 1960) was a Cuban politician and interim President of Cuba.

A chief opponent of Gerardo Machado, Mendieta was installed as interim President of Cuba in 1934 by a coup led by Fulgencio Batista. During his presidency, women gained the right to vote and the Platt Amendment was rescinded.  Mendieta resigned in 1935 after unrest continued.

Personal life 
He was married to Carmela Ledon (? - 20 July 1942) and they had one child, Carmen Mendieta-Ledon, who married Calixto Garcia Velez.

References

  (Spanish)

1873 births
1960 deaths
People from Camajuaní
Cuban people of Basque descent
Presidents of Cuba
1930s in Cuba
20th-century Cuban politicians